Steven Robert Ades (born 1 March 1982) is a former English first-class cricketer.  Ades was a right-handed batsman who bowled right-arm off break.

Biography
Born in Brighton, Sussex, Ades represented the Sussex Cricket Board in List A cricket.  The first of these came against Herefordshire in the 2000 NatWest Trophy.  From 2000 to 2001, he represented the county in five List A matches, the last of which came against Wales Minor Counties in the second round of the 2002 Cheltenham & Gloucester Trophy which was held in 2001.  In his five matches, he scored 3 runs at a batting average of 1.66, with a high score of 3.  In the field he took a single catch.  With the ball he took 5 wickets at a bowling average of 41.20, with best figures of 2/37.

References

External links
Steven Ades at ESPNcricinfo
Steven Ades at CricketArchive

1982 births
Living people
Sportspeople from Brighton
English cricketers
Sussex Cricket Board cricketers